Bedford is the county town of Bedfordshire, England.
 Bedford (UK Parliament constituency), the parliamentary constituency covering much of Bedford's built-up area
 Borough of Bedford, the local authority area covering Bedford, and surrounding towns and villages in north Bedfordshire

Bedford may also refer to:

Places

Australia
 Bedford, Western Australia

Canada
 Bedford, Nova Scotia
 Bedford (provincial electoral district), Nova Scotia
 Bedford, Quebec (city)
 Bedford, Quebec (township)
 Bedford Basin, part of Halifax Harbour in Nova Scotia

South Africa
 Bedford, Eastern Cape
 Bedfordview, a suburb of Johannesburg

United Kingdom
 Bedford, Greater Manchester, a suburb of Leigh
 The Bedford Estate, a central London estate
 Bedford Level, an alternative name for The Great Level, a part of The Fens

United States
 Bedford, Indiana
 Bedford, Iowa
 Bedford, Kentucky
 Bedford, Massachusetts
 Bedford, New Hampshire
 In New York State
 Bedford (town), New York, in Westchester County
 Bedford (CDP), New York, known as Bedford Village, in Westchester County
 Bedford Park, Bronx, a neighborhood in New York City
 Bedford Avenue (Brooklyn), a major thoroughfare in New York City
 Bedford, Ohio
 Bedford, Pennsylvania
 Bedford, Tennessee
 Bedford, Texas
 Bedford, Virginia
 Bedford, Wyoming
 Bedford Township (disambiguation)

Buildings
 The Bedford, Balham, a public house and music venue in Balham, London
 Bedford Castle, a ruin of a medieval castle in Bedford
 Bedford Civic Theatre, a former theatre in Bedford
 Bedford Esquires, a pub, nightclub and live music venue in Bedford
 Bedford Hospital, a general hospital in Bedford, England
 Bedford Provincial Hospital (Eastern Cape), a general hospital in Bedford, Eastern Cape, South Africa
 Bedford Hotel (Brighton), a hotel in Brighton
 Bedford Museum & Art Gallery, a local museum and art gallery serving North Bedfordshire
 Bedford (HM Prison), a prison serving Bedford and north Bedfordshire

People
 Bedford (surname)
 Earl or Duke of Bedford, a title in the Peerage of England

Schools 
 Bedford College, Bedford, a college in Bedford, Bedfordshire
 Bedford High School, Bedfordshire, a former girls public school in Bedford, Bedfordshire
 Bedford High School (Leigh), Greater Manchester, England
 Bedford Modern School, a coeducational public school in Bedford, Bedfordshire
 Bedford School, a boys' public school in Bedford, Bedfordshire

Sports teams
 Bedford Blues, a rugby union club in Bedford, Bedfordshire
 Bedford F.C., a football club in Bedford, Bedfordshire
 Bedford Tigers, a rugby league club in Bedford, Bedfordshire
 Bedford Town F.C., another football club in Bedford, Bedfordshire

Railway stations
 Bedford railway station, a railway station in Bedford, England
 Bedford station (Virginia), a proposed Transdominion Express station in Bedford, Virginia

Other uses
 HMS Bedford, the name of several ships
 USS Bedford, a fictitious ship in the 1965 movie The Bedford Incident
 Bedford Vehicles, a former British manufacturer of trucks and commercial vehicles
 Harpur Trust, a.k.a. The Bedford Charity, a charity based in Bedford, Bedfordshire
 Bedford cord, a heavy fabric resembling corduroy
 Bedford crop or Bedford level, an eponymous hairstyle, named after Francis Russell, 5th Duke of Bedford

See also

 Bedford Flag, an 18th-century military flag associated with Bedford, Massachusetts
 New Bedford (disambiguation)